Zakolpye is a rural locality (a station) in Grigoryevskoye Rural Settlement, Gus-Khrustalny District, Vladimir Oblast, Russia. The population was 352 as of 2010. There are 2 streets.

Geography 
The village is located 25 km south-east from Gus-Khrustalny.

References 

Rural localities in Gus-Khrustalny District
Melenkovsky Uyezd